Pietro Melchiorre Ferrari (1735 - 1787) was an Italian painter, active mainly in Parma in a late-Baroque and early Neoclassical style.

He was born in Sissa in the Province of Parma; his father, Paolo, was a painter in the Ducal court. Pietro studied  under Giuseppe Peroni, and later in the Academy of Fine Arts at Parma under Giuseppe Baldrighi.

References

1735 births
1787 deaths
18th-century Italian painters
Italian male painters
Painters from Parma
Italian Baroque painters
18th-century Italian male artists